Nathoki is a town and Union Council of Kasur District in the Punjab province of Pakistan. It is part of Kasur Tehsil and is located at 31°6'44N 74°7'35E with an altitude of 189 metres (623 feet).
It carries four villages along with it. Syed Javaid Hayat Shah is Chairman of this council.

References

Kasur District